A beam homogenizer is a device that smooths out the irregularities in a laser beam profile and creates a more uniform one. Most beam homogenizers use a multifaceted mirror with square facets. The mirror reflects light at different angles to create a beam with uniform power across the whole beam profile (a "top hat" profile). Some applications of beam homogenizers include their use with excimer lasers for making computer processing chips and with CO2 lasers for heat treating.

Most laser beam outputs usually have Gaussian energy distribution. Using beam homogenizer will create an evenly distributed energy of the beam instead of the Gaussian shape. Unlike beam shaper who create a certain shape to the beam, beam homogenizer spread the central concentrated energy among the beam diameter so the results are sometimes grainy.
An example for simple beam homogenizer can be just a murky glass, after it, the beam will be more homogenized. However, this is a very simple solution with low efficiency causing a blurry beam. For most applications/uses, advanced methods of beam homogenizing are required such as diffractive beam homogenizer or using MLA (Micro Lens Array).

External links
Lens Array Vs Rod Lens For Laser Beam Homogenization

Optical devices
Laser science